is a former Japanese tennis player.

Iwami has a career high ATP singles ranking of 260 achieved on 23 June 2003. He also has a career high ATP doubles ranking of 306 achieved on 7 February 2011.

Iwami made his ATP World Tour main draw debut at the 2003 AIG Japan Open Tennis Championships after qualifying for the singles main draw. In 2018, he became the personal coach of wheelchair tennis icon Shingo Kunieda.

References

External links

1978 births
Living people
Japanese male tennis players
Sportspeople from Fukuoka (city)
20th-century Japanese people
21st-century Japanese people